The 2001 South Australian National Football League (SANFL) Grand Final saw the Central District Bulldogs defeat the Woodville-West Torrens by 39 points to claim the club's second premiership victory.

The match was played on Sunday 7 October 2001 at Football Park in front of a crowd of 26,378.

The Jack Oatey Medal for the best player on the ground was won by Central's Rick MacGowan.

References 

SANFL Grand Finals
Sanfl Grand Final, 2001